Çəmənli, Beylagan may refer to these people:
Aşağı Çəmənli, Azerbaijan
Yuxarı Çəmənli, Azerbaijan